Take a Look Inside is an album by Melbourne-based punk rock outfit, Bodyjar. The line-up were  Cameron Baines on guitar, Ben Petterson on vocals and guitar, Grant Relf on bass guitar and backing vocals, and Charles Zerafa on drums. Recorded in 1994 at Sing Sing Studios in Richmond, it was produced and engineered by two members of United States punk band, Descendents: Bill Stevenson and Stephen Egerton. The lead single, "Time to Grow Up", received moderate radio airplay on Melbourne based RRR FM, and on Australian national youth radio station Triple J.

Track listing
 "Do Not Do"
 "Time to Grow Up"
 "Gee and Al"
 "So Easy"
 "Nothing's Clear"
 "Joker"
 "2 Many Times"
 "Double Standard"
 "Punk Ass"
 "Hardway"
 "Parking Space"
 "Take A Look Inside"

References

Bodyjar albums
Shock Records albums
1994 albums
Albums produced by Bill Stevenson (musician)